Nekrasovsky is an urban locality (an urban-type settlement) in Dmitrovsky District of Moscow Oblast, Russia. Population:

References

Urban-type settlements in Moscow Oblast
Populated places in Dmitrovsky District, Moscow Oblast